Ilmmünster is a municipality in the district of Pfaffenhofen in Bavaria in Germany. It is not quite known by many, but it has many interesting places to visit based on history.

References

Pfaffenhofen (district)